Jolanda (also called Yolanda) was a Cypriot cargo ship built in 1964 in Gijón, Spain by SA Juliana Constructora. She was grounded on a reef at Ras Muhammad on 1 April 1980. From 1981 to 1985, the wreck was a popular dive site, but it was lost when it fell off the reef during a storm in March 1987. Today, cargo from the wreckage, including British toilets, bath tubs and pipes, is visited by recreational divers.

References 

Shipwrecks of Africa
Maritime incidents in 1980
Ships of Cyprus
Shipwrecks in the Red Sea